The following events occurred in October 1954:

October 1, 1954 (Friday)
The British colony of Nigeria becomes the autonomous Federation of Nigeria.
China Construction Bank was founded in Beijing, China.

October 2, 1954 (Saturday)
The 1954 World Series baseball competition is won by the New York Giants.

October 3, 1954 (Sunday)
Born: Stevie Ray Vaughan, American musician (d. 1990)

October 4, 1954 (Monday)
The Dutch cutter Jonge Jochem sails from Den Helder, and is never heard from again.

October 5, 1954 (Tuesday)

October 6, 1954 (Wednesday)
 Author William Dudley (The Chosen River) is born in Alamance County, North Carolina. In 1958, his parents moved to Winston-Salem, NC, where he grew up and went to school, graduating from Reynolds High School in 1972. After a year at Wake Forest University, he transferred to the University of South Carolina in Columbia, NC, and majored in English, studying writing with William Price Fox. He graduated magna cum laude in 1976 and moved to San Francisco, California in 1977, where he still lives. He is married to the poet Claudia Jensen Dudley, for 40 years, and has two daughters (Anne and Clara) and two granddaughters (Leila and Emily). 
 Primate of Poland Stefan Wyszyński, imprisoned by the communist government, was relocated from Stoczek Klasztorny to Prudnik.

October 7, 1954 (Thursday)
Danish cargo ship Rikke Skou sinks off Terschelling, Netherlands, with the loss of twelve of her twenty crew.
British cargo ship La Pampa and coaster Seahorse both run aground in the Scheldt, Belgium.
US ore carrier Mormackite capsizes and sinks off the coast of Virginia with the loss of 37 of her 48 crew.

October 8, 1954 (Friday)

October 9, 1954 (Saturday)
Norwegian cargo ship Emma Bakke is in the Atlantic Ocean when there was a boiler explosion and fire. The crew abandon ship, and are rescued by Argentine ship Corrientes and taken to Lisbon, Portugal. Two crew are killed in the explosion and the ship sinks.
Another Norwegian cargo ship, Jane Stove, suffers a fracture to her main deck whilst in the North Sea, but eventually reaches the Faroe Islands on 10 October.
Died: Robert H. Jackson, 62, United States Supreme Court associate justice and chief prosecutor at the Nuremberg Trials (myocardial infarction)

October 10, 1954 (Sunday)
In the Guatemalan general election, 99.92% of voters vote in favour of the presidency of Carlos Castillo Armas, whilst the National Anti-Communist Front wins 57 of the 65 seats in the Assembly.

October 11, 1954 (Monday)
Pre-Vietnam War: The civil administration of North Vietnam is transferred to the Việt Minh, and Hồ Chí Minh is appointed Prime Minister of North Vietnam.
Hurricane Hazel crosses Haiti, destroying villages and causing considerable damage to major cities. An estimated 1,000 people are killed. Hazel also destroys about 40% of the coffee trees and 50% of the cacao crop, affecting the country's economy for several years.

October 12, 1954 (Tuesday)
South Africa's Prime Minister, D. F. Malan, announces his retirement, to a "dumbfounded" cabinet.
Died: George Welch, 36, US test pilot and World War II flying ace, killed in the crash of a North American F-100A Super Sabre during a test flight; the incident results in the grounding of all F-100A aircraft.

October 13, 1954 (Wednesday)

October 14, 1954 (Thursday)
The first American four-stage rocket is launched by the Pilotless Aircraft Research Division of NACA's Langley Laboratory at Wallops Island.

October 15, 1954 (Friday)
Hurricane Hazel makes U.S. landfall; it is the only recorded Category 4 hurricane to strike as far north as North Carolina.

October 16, 1954 (Saturday)
Elvis Presley makes his first radio broadcast, on a show in Shreveport, Louisiana, called Louisiana Hayride.

October 17, 1954 (Sunday)

October 18, 1954 (Monday)
Texas Instruments announces the development of the first commercial transistor radio. The Regency TR-1 goes on sale the following month.
The comic strip Hi and Lois, by Mort Walker and Dik Browne, is launched.
In the UK government, Selwyn Lloyd takes over from Duncan Sandys as Minister of Supply. Sandys becomes Minister of Housing.

October 19, 1954 (Tuesday)
The English region of Exmoor becomes a National Park.
Born: Agnes M. Sigurðardóttir, Iceland's first woman bishop, in Ísafjörður

October 20, 1954 (Wednesday)
A dock workers' strike in the UK begins to escalate.

October 21, 1954 (Thursday)

October 22, 1954 (Friday)
Died: Jibanananda Das, 55, Indian poet, writer, novelist and essayist in Bengali, of injuries sustained when hit by a tram near Calcutta's Deshapriya Park on 14 October.

October 23, 1954 (Saturday)
West Germany joins NATO.
Paris Agreement sets up the Western European Union to implement the Treaty of Brussels (1948) providing for mutual self-defence and other collaboration between Belgium, France, West Germany, Italy, Luxembourg, the Netherlands and the United Kingdom.

October 24, 1954 (Sunday)
The Spanish Grand Prix is held at Pedralbes and won by Mike Hawthorn. It would be the last held in Spain until 1967.
Hungarian footballer Sándor Kocsis scores his sixth international hat trick in a match against Czechoslovakia.
Born: Malcolm Turnbull, Australian politician, 29th Prime Minister of Australia

October 25, 1954 (Monday)
Landslides caused by heavy rains hit Salerno, Italy, killing about 300.

October 26, 1954 (Tuesday)
Muslim Brotherhood member Mahmoud Abdul Latif tries to kill Gamal Abdel Nasser.

October 27, 1954 (Wednesday)

October 28, 1954 (Thursday)
Died: Wu Chuanyu, 26, Chinese Olympic swimmer, killed when Aeroflot Flight 136, an Ilyushin Il-12 (registration CCCP-L1789) on a domestic flight in the Soviet Union from Irkutsk Airport in Irkutsk to Krasnoyarsk Airport in Krasnoyarsk, flies into the side of Mount Sivukha, killing all 19 people on board.

October 29, 1954 (Friday)
Born: Lee Child (real name Jim Grant), English thriller writer, in Coventry

October 30, 1954 (Saturday)
The search for the missing aircraft will end on November 4 because of extreme weather conditions, and no sign of the plane or the 42 people on board is ever found.
Died: Wilbur Shaw, 51, US racing driver, in an air crash at Decatur, Indiana; pilot Ray Grimes and artist Ernest Roose are also killed.

October 31, 1954 (Sunday)
Algerian War of Independence: The Algerian National Liberation Front begins a revolt against French rule.
The 1954 LPGA Golf Tour concludes.

References

1954
1954-10
1954-10